Mark John Calcavecchia (born June 12, 1960) is an American professional golfer and a former PGA Tour member. During his professional career, he won 13 PGA Tour events, including the 1989 Open Championship. He plays on the Champions Tour as well as a limited PGA Tour schedule that includes The Open Championship.

Early years
Calcavecchia was born in Laurel, Nebraska. While he was a teenager, his family moved from Nebraska to West Palm Beach, Florida in 1973.

He attended North Shore High School in West Palm Beach, and won the Florida high school golf championship in 1977 while playing for the North Shore golf team.  While playing in junior tournaments, Calcavecchia often competed against Jack Nicklaus' son, Jackie, and as a result began a lifelong friendship at the age of 14 with the legendary pro.

College career
He accepted an athletic scholarship to the University of Florida in Gainesville, where he played for coach Buster Bishop and coach John Darr's Florida Gators men's golf teams in National Collegiate Athletic Association (NCAA) competition from 1978 to 1980. Calcavecchia earned first-team All-Southeastern Conference (SEC) honors in 1979.

Professional career
Calcavecchia turned professional in 1981 and joined the PGA Tour in 1982, but lost his card after the 1985 season. His most notable achievement was in 1989, when he won The Open Championship (the "British Open"), one of the four major championships, by beating Wayne Grady and Greg Norman in a four-hole playoff at Royal Troon in Scotland.

Upon being awarded the Open's Claret Jug, Calcavecchia (whose Italian surname translates as "old crowd") asked "How's my name going to fit on that thing?" He later revealed that he had initially not wanted to play in the Open Championship that year due to his wife expecting their first child, but he was persuaded to fly to Scotland to compete in the tournament by his wife. He also revealed that he didn't know that the Open Championship had a four-hole aggregate playoff format until just before he teed off in the playoff. Calcavecchia shares the record for the lowest back nine in the Masters at 29, in 1992. 1989 was Calcavecchia's only multiple-win season on the PGA Tour, with two other titles complementing the Open. He also finished second behind Sandy Lyle at the 1988 Masters Tournament by a single stroke.

Calcavecchia has won 13 times on the PGA Tour and 13 times in other professional events. He spent 109 weeks in the top 10 of the Official World Golf Rankings from 1988 to 1991. In winning the 2001 Phoenix Open, he set the Tour scoring record at that time by making 32 birdies in 72 holes finishing at 28 under par for the tournament. He has won the Phoenix Open three times (1989, 1992, 2001), and his margins of victory in the Phoenix tournament are also his three largest. He was a member of the U.S. Ryder Cup team in 1987, 1989, 1991 and 2002. His performance in 1991 is most remembered, as he lost a four-hole lead to Colin Montgomerie in the last four holes of his round.  Thinking he had cost his team the victory, he broke down in tears—not knowing the U.S. team would still win.

On July 25, 2009, Calcavecchia set a PGA Tour record by getting nine consecutive birdies during his second round at the RBC Canadian Open at the Glen Abbey Golf Course in Oakville, Ontario, Canada.  The birdies came on the 12th through 18th holes, and then on the first and second hole (he started his round on the 10th hole). The previous record of eight consecutive birdies was held by six golfers including J. P. Hayes, who was one of his partners at the time Calcavecchia achieved the new record.

Calcavecchia joined the Champions Tour in 2010, but still plays a limited PGA Tour schedule that includes The Open Championship.  His eligibility for The Open expired in 2020 after he turned 60, but after the COVID-19 pandemic cancelled that tournament, he was grandfathered into the 2021 tournament, but was unable to attend due to surgery. Calcavecchia's exemption was extended to 2022.

Personal
Calcavecchia has two children, Eric and Britney, with his previous wife Sheryl. He married, secondly, on May 5, 2005 in Lake Como, Italy, to Brenda Nardecchia. He has homes in Jupiter, Florida and Phoenix, Arizona.

Professional wins (29)

PGA Tour wins (13)

PGA Tour playoff record (1–4)

PGA Tour of Australasia wins (1)

Korean Tour wins (1)

South American Tour wins (2)
1993 Argentine Open
1995 Argentine Open

Other wins (7)

Other playoff record (1–1)

PGA Tour Champions wins (4)

PGA Tour Champions playoff record (1–0)

Other senior wins (1)
2011 Nedbank Champions Challenge

Major championships

Wins (1)

1Defeated Grady and Norman in a four-hole aggregate playoff: Calcavecchia (4-3-3-3=13), Grady (4-4-4-4=16), Norman (3-3-4-x)

Results timeline
Results not in chronological order in 2020.

DQ = Disqualified
WD = Withdrew
CUT = missed the half-way cut
"T" indicates a tie for a place
NT = No tournament due to the COVID-19 pandemic

Summary

Most consecutive cuts made – 9 (1991 PGA – 1993 PGA)
Longest streak of top-10s – 1 (seven times)

Results in The Players Championship

CUT = missed the halfway cut
"T" indicates a tie for a place

Results in World Golf Championships

1Cancelled due to 9/11

QF, R16, R32, R64 = Round in which player lost in match play
"T" = Tied
NT = No tournament

Results in senior major championships
Results are not in chronological order prior to 2022.

CUT = missed the halfway cut
WD = withdrew
"T" indicates a tie for a place
NT = No tournament due to COVID-19 pandemic

U.S. national team appearances
Professional
Ryder Cup: 1987, 1989 (tie), 1991 (winners), 2002
Four Tours World Championship: 1987 (winners), 1989 (winners), 1990
Dunhill Cup: 1989 (winners), 1990
Presidents Cup: 1998
UBS Warburg Cup: 2001 (winners)
Wendy's 3-Tour Challenge: 2001 (PGA Tour), 2003 (PGA Tour, winners), 2005 (PGA Tour), 2011 (Champions Tour, winners)

See also

Spring 1981 PGA Tour Qualifying School graduates
1983 PGA Tour Qualifying School graduates
List of American Ryder Cup golfers
List of Florida Gators men's golfers on the PGA Tour

References

External links

Mark Calcavecchia at Gaylord Sports

American male golfers
Florida Gators men's golfers
PGA Tour golfers
PGA Tour Champions golfers
Winners of men's major golf championships
Ryder Cup competitors for the United States
Golfers from Nebraska
People from Cedar County, Nebraska
People from Palm Beach Gardens, Florida
1960 births
Living people